This is an incomplete list of notable alumni and faculty (past and present) of the University of Johannesburg including notable people from the merger of the Rand Afrikaans University (RAU), the Technikon Witwatersrand (TWR) and Vista University into the University of Johannesburg.

Alumni

Athletes

Business

Politics

Faculty

Honorary doctorates
The university may confer advanced degrees, including an honorary doctoral degree honoris causa as an academic award in any faculty. The university follows a conservative awards policy in order to emphasise the extraordinary and inherent value of the honorary doctorate.

References

University of Johannesburg